Holy Trinity Church, York may refer to:

Holy Trinity Church, Goodramgate, York, a church in York, England
Holy Trinity Church, King's Court, a church in York, England
Holy Trinity Church, Micklegate, York, a church in York, England
Holy Trinity Church, York, Western Australia, a church in York, Australia

See also
Holy Trinity Church (disambiguation), which lists several churches in New York City and Yorkshire